Sambucus velutina, the velvet elder, is a relatively large, deciduous shrub that is endemic to the Southwestern region of the United States. This particular species is characteristic of Central California and Western Nevada.

Morphological characteristics 
The velvet elder has medium-hued, green, pinnate leaves, that are notably hairy to the touch. Generally, there are about 5-9 individual leaflets present, each measuring anywhere from 5-30 centimeters (cm) in length. The plants are capable of growing up to anywhere from 3–8 meters (m) in height, with a typical, relatively thick, stem diameter of approximately 30-60 centimeter (cm). These plants have berries that are black and deep blue in color. These characteristics can be observed amongst many of the similar species that will be briefly discussed below.

Similar species 
There are numerous, closely related species that are typically found throughout many regions of North America. Sambucus velutina is exclusively found in the Southwestern portion of the United States, yet multiple other genetically similar species can also be found living in other areas of the country. A few examples of such species include Sambucus canadensis (American elder), Sambucus cerulea (blue elderberry), and Sambucus simpsonii (Florida elder).

References 
plant.photos.net
plantmaps.com

velutina
Flora of California
Flora of Nevada
Flora without expected TNC conservation status